Birdsongs of the Mesozoic is the eponymous first EP by the American Avant-rock band Birdsongs of the Mesozoic, released in 1983 by Ace of Hearts Records.

Release and reception
Never being individually issued on Compact Disc, only some of Birdsongs of the Mesozoic had been included on compilations such as Sonic Geology and The Fossil Record. Finally, the entire EP was issued by Cuneiform Records on Dawn of the Cycads, a two-disc anthology including most of the band's early work.

Track listing

Personnel
Adapted from the Birdsongs of the Mesozoic liner notes.

Birdsongs of the Mesozoic
Erik Lindgren – synthesizer, electronic drums
Roger Miller – piano, snare drum, cymbal, voice, tom toms (A2, B2), reed organ (A1)
Rick Scott – organ, maracas
Martin Swope – electric guitar, cymbal, tape (A3, B2), acoustic guitar (A1)

Additional musicians
Michael Cohen – cymbal and rototom (A2, B2)
Leon Janikian – clarinet (A1)
Karen Kaderavek – cello (B1)
Peter Prescott – tom toms (B2)
Steve Stain – percussion (B2)
Production and additional personnel
Birdsongs of the Mesozoic – production
Richard W. Harte – production
Jeff Whitehead – engineering

Release history

References

External links 
 Birdsongs of the Mesozoic at Discogs (list of releases)

1983 debut EPs
Birdsongs of the Mesozoic albums
Instrumental rock EPs